Twin Brothers is a  Navajo Sandstone mountain in Zion National Park in Washington County , Utah, United States.

Description
It is set on the east side of the North Fork of the Virgin River which drains precipitation runoff from this mountain. Its neighbors across the canyon include Bee Hive, The Sentinel,  and Mount Moroni. Mount Spry, set southwest and below Twin Brothers, often appears in photos taken of both from park headquarters. This feature's name was officially adopted in 1934 by the U.S. Board on Geographic Names.

Climate
Spring and fall are the most favorable seasons to visit Twin Brothers. According to the Köppen climate classification system, it is located in a Cold semi-arid climate zone, which is defined by the coldest month having an average mean temperature below 32 °F (0 °C), and at least 50% of the total annual precipitation being received during the spring and summer.

Gallery

See also

 List of mountains in Utah
 Geology of the Zion and Kolob canyons area
 Colorado Plateau

References

External links

 Zion National Park National Park Service
 Twin Brothers rock climbing: mountainproject.com
 Weather forecast: Twin Brothers
 Climbing photos: 13ergirl.com

Mountains of Utah
Zion National Park
Mountains of Washington County, Utah
Sandstone formations of the United States
Colorado Plateau
North American 2000 m summits